Swordfish (Xiphias gladius), also known as broadbills in some countries, are large, highly migratory predatory fish characterized by a long, flat, pointed bill. They are a popular sport fish of the billfish category, though elusive. Swordfish are elongated, round-bodied, and lose all teeth and scales by adulthood.

They are the sole member of their family, Xiphiidae.

Taxonomy and etymology
The swordfish is named after its long pointed, flat bill, which resembles a sword. This makes it superficially similar to other billfish such as marlin, but upon examination, their physiology is quite different and they are members of different families.

Several extinct genera are known, such as a large sized Xiphiorhynchus and Aglyptorhynchus. Unlike modern taxa these have equally long lower jaws.

Description
The International Game Fish Association's all-tackle angling record for a swordfish was a  specimen taken off Chile in 1953. Females are larger than males, and Pacific swordfish reach a greater size than northwest Atlantic and Mediterranean swordfish. They reach maturity at 4–5 years of age and the maximum age is believed to be at least 9 years. The oldest swordfish found in a recent study were a 16-year-old female and 12-year-old male. Swordfish ages are derived, with difficulty, from annual rings on fin rays rather than otoliths, since their otoliths are small in size.

Swordfish are ectothermic animals; however, along with some species of sharks, they have special organs next to their eyes to heat their eyes and brains. The heating of the eyes greatly improves their vision, and consequently improves their ability to catch prey. Of over 25,000 fish species, only 22 are known to have a mechanism to conserve heat. These include the swordfish, marlin, tuna, and some sharks.

Behavior and ecology

Movements and feeding 
The popular belief of the "sword" being used as a spear is misleading. Their nose is more likely used to slash at its prey to injure the prey animal, to make for an easier catch. The use as an offensive spear in case of dangers against large sharks or animals is under review.

Mainly, the swordfish relies on its great speed and agility in the water to catch its prey.

Swordfish are not schooling fish. They are frequently found basking at the surface, airing their first dorsal fin. Boaters report this to be a beautiful sight, as is the powerful jumping for which the species is known. This jumping, also called breaching, may be an effort to dislodge pests, such as remoras or lampreys.

This highly migratory species typically moves towards colder regions to feed during the summer. Swordfish feed daily, most often at night, when they rise to surface and near-surface waters in search of smaller fish. Adults feed on a wide range of pelagic fish, such as mackerel, barracudinas, silver hake, rockfish, herring, and lanternfishes, but they also take demersal fish, squid, and crustaceans. In the northwestern Atlantic, a survey based on the stomach content of 168 individuals found 82% had eaten squid and 53% had eaten fish, including gadids, scombrids, butterfish, bluefish, and sand lance. Large prey are typically slashed with the sword, while small are swallowed whole.

Threats and parasites 
Almost 50 species of parasites have been documented in swordfish. In addition to remoras, lampreys, and cookiecutter sharks, this includes a wide range of invertebrates, such as tapeworms, roundworms, Myxozoans and copepods. A comparison of the parasites of swordfish in the Atlantic and in the Mediterranean indicated that some parasites, particularly Anisakis spp. larvae identified by genetic markers, could be used as biological tags and support the existence of a Mediterranean swordfish stock.

Fully adult swordfish have few natural predators. Among marine mammals, killer whales sometimes prey on adult swordfish. The shortfin mako, an exceptionally fast species of shark, sometimes take on swordfish; dead or dying shortfin makos have been found with broken-off swords in their heads, revealing the danger of this type of prey. Juvenile swordfish are far more vulnerable to predation, and are eaten by a wide range of predatory fish. Intensive fishery may be driving swordfishes and sharks into harder competition for reduced amounts of prey and therefore pitting them to fight more.

Human fishery is a major predator of swordfishes.

Breeding 
In the North Pacific, batch spawning mainly occurs in water warmer than  during the spring and summer, and year-round in the equatorial Pacific. Spawning occurs from November to February in the South Atlantic off southern Brazil. Spawning is year-round in the Caribbean Sea and other warm regions of the west Atlantic.

Large females can carry more eggs than small females, and between 1 million to 29 million eggs have been recorded. The pelagic eggs measure  in diameter and  days after fertilization, the embryonic development occurs. The bill is evident when the larvae reach  in length.

Fisheries

Swordfish were harvested by a variety of methods at small scale (notably harpoon fishing) until the global expansion of long-line fishing. They have been fished widely since ancient times in places such as the Strait of Messina, where they are still fished with traditional wooden boats called feluccas and are part of the cuisine in that area.

Swordfish are vigorous, powerful fighters. Although no unprovoked attacks on humans have been reported, swordfish can be very dangerous when harpooned. They have run their swords through the planking of small boats when hurt. In 2015, a Hawaiian fisherman was killed by a swordfish after attempting to spear the animal.

Recreational fishing 

Recreational fishing has developed a subspecialty called swordfishing. Because of a ban on long-lining along many parts of seashore, swordfish populations are showing signs of recovery from the overfishing caused by long-lining along the coast.

Various ways are used to fish for swordfish, but the most common method is deep-drop fishing, since swordfish spend most daylight hours very deep, in the deep scattering layer. The boat is allowed to drift to present a more natural bait. Standard baits are whole mackerel, herring, mullet, bonito, or squid; one can also use live bait. Imitation squids and other imitation fish lures can also be used, and specialized lures made specifically for swordfishing often have battery-powered or glow lights. Even baits are typically presented using glow sticks or specialized deepwater-proof battery operated lights.

As food 

Swordfish are classified as oily fish. Many sources, including the United States Food and Drug Administration, warn about potential toxicity from high levels of methylmercury in swordfish. The FDA recommends that young children, pregnant women, and women of child-bearing age not eat swordfish.

The flesh of some swordfish can acquire an orange tint, reportedly from their diet of shrimp or other prey. Such fish are sold as "pumpkin swordfish", and command a premium over their whitish counterparts.

Swordfish is a particularly popular fish for cooking. Since swordfish are large, meat is usually sold as steaks, which are often grilled. Swordfish meat is relatively firm, and can be cooked in ways more fragile types of fish cannot (such as over a grill on skewers). The color of the flesh varies by diet, with fish caught on the East Coast of North America often being rosier.

Conservation status 

In 1998, the US Natural Resources Defense Council and SeaWeb hired Fenton Communications to conduct an advertising campaign to promote their assertion that the swordfish population was in danger due to its popularity as a restaurant entree.

The resulting "Give Swordfish a Break" promotion was wildly successful, with 750 prominent US chefs agreeing to remove North Atlantic swordfish from their menus, and also persuaded many supermarkets and consumers across the country.

The advertising campaign was repeated by the national media in hundreds of print and broadcast stories, as well as extensive regional coverage. It earned the Silver Anvil award from the Public Relations Society of America, as well as Time magazine's award for the top five environmental stories of 1998.

Subsequently, the US National Marine Fisheries Service proposed a swordfish protection plan that incorporated the campaign's policy suggestions. Then-US President Bill Clinton called for a ban on the sale and import of swordfish and in a landmark decision by the federal government,  of the Atlantic Ocean were placed off-limits to fishing as recommended by the sponsors.

In the North Atlantic, the swordfish stock is fully rebuilt, with biomass estimates currently 5% above the target level. No robust stock assessments for swordfish in the northwestern Pacific or South Atlantic have been made, and data concerning stock status in these regions are lacking. These stocks are considered unknown and a moderate conservation concern. The southwestern Pacific stock is a moderate concern due to model uncertainty, increasing catches, and declining catch per unit effort. Overfishing is likely occurring in the Indian Ocean, and fishing mortality exceeds the maximum recommended level in the Mediterranean, thus these stocks are considered of high conservation concern.

In 2010, Greenpeace International added the swordfish to its seafood red list.

Extinct 
Xiphiorhynchoides

In culture
The swordfish (Xiphias) has been used by astronomers as another name for the constellation of Dorado.

References

Further reading

External links 

 Swordfish, Seafood Watch, Monterey Bay Aquarium
 FDA Consumer:Mercury In Fish:Cause For Concern?

 
Cosmopolitan fish
Oily fish
Sport fish
Hawaiian cuisine
Greek cuisine
Fish described in 1758
Extant Pliocene first appearances
Taxa named by Carl Linnaeus